Franz Jacob may refer to:

 Franz Jacob (bobsleigh), Austrian bobsledder
 Franz Jacob (Resistance fighter) (1906–1944), German Resistance fighter
 Franz G. Jacob (1870–?), German chess master